William Jones was a footballer in the early 20th century.

Career
Jones joined Burslem Port Vale in August 1905, his debut came in a 3–1 loss at Lincoln City on 2 September 1905. After making just a further three Football League and two Birmingham Cup appearances he was released at the end of the season.

Career statistics
Source:

References

Year of birth missing
Year of death missing
English footballers
Association football defenders
English Football League players
Port Vale F.C. players